George Sidney "Mallee" Johnson (31 May 1879 – 5 September 1948) was an Australian rules footballer who played for the Carlton Football Club in the VFL between 1905 and 1909.

Career
Commencing at Richmond in the VFA in 1901, 'Mallee' Johnson became "a folk hero to the club ... the first of the super-heroes".
By 1902 he was the dominant big man in the competition and an integral part of Richmond winning their first premiership.

He left Punt Road for the VFL prior to the 1905 season and in his five seasons at Carlton the team played in the finals every year, winning the premiership in 1906, 1907 and 1908. Johnson represented the VFL at the 1908 Melbourne Carnival.

When legendary Carlton coach Jack Worrall was pressured into resigning in 1909, Johnson was one of the players who chose to leave the club at the end of the season. He went back to the VFA and played in North Melbourne's 1910 premiership side and later with Melbourne City, where he was the inaugural captain, and Prahran.

Notes

References
Holmesby, R. and Main, J. The Encyclopedia of AFL Footballers – Sixth Edition, BAS Publishing, Melbourne 2005

External links

George S Johnson at Blueseum

1879 births
Carlton Football Club players
Carlton Football Club Premiership players
North Melbourne Football Club (VFA) players
Richmond Football Club (VFA) players
Prahran Football Club players
Australian rules footballers from Victoria (Australia)
1948 deaths
Three-time VFL/AFL Premiership players